The Xe Kaman is a river in southeastern Laos. It flows through the Dong Ampham National Biodiversity Conservation Area of  Attapeu Province. The river is known to have populations of dolphins. The area is being destroyed by a dam being built on the river. The village of Ban Hin Dam lies on the river and is where boat trips are launched.

References

Rivers of Laos
Geography of Attapeu province